Auke Swevers (born 26 August 2004) is a Belgian footballer who plays as a defender for OH Leuven and the Belgium national team.

International career
Swevers made her debut for the Belgium national team on 12 June 2021, against Luxembourg.

References

2004 births
Living people
Women's association football defenders
Belgian women's footballers
Belgium women's international footballers
Oud-Heverlee Leuven (women) players
Super League Vrouwenvoetbal players
Belgium women's youth international footballers